Bomber Moran, born Arturo Ocampo, (October 18, 1944 - August 14, 2004) was a Filipino actor noted for his starring roles in action movies.

Life and career
Moran was born in Manila, Philippines on October 18, 1944. During his career he acted in over 400 movies, often portraying "mean tough guy" characters. He was married to Erlinda Ocampo and had two children; Ramon and Sarah. He died at his home in San Francisco, California, on August 14, 2004. His cause of death was non-communicable disease.

Filmography

Film

References

1944 births
2004 deaths
Deaths from cancer in California
Deaths from prostate cancer
Filipino male child actors
Filipino male film actors
Male actors from Manila